is a Japanese voice actor formerly affiliated with Mausu Promotion and currently affiliated with Amuleto.  His name was  until April 1, 2008.

Filmography

Anime series
Bakusō Kyōdai Let's & Go!! WGP (1997) (Luchino)
Naruto (2002) (Mubi, Gamakichi)
Ikki Tousen (2003) (Genjo Kakouton)
Azusa, Otetsudai Shimasu! (2004) (Nakasato Akira)
Burst Angel (2004) (Salesclerk)
DearS (2004) (No. 3)
Basilisk (2005) (Kisaragi Saemon)
Bleach (2005) (Maned Shinigami)
Fighting Beauty Wulong (2005) (Kumakubo)
009-1 (2006) (Dr. Green)
Kotetsushin Jeeg (2007) (Senjirou Shiba)
La Corda d'Oro: Primo Passo (2007) (Music Teacher)
Sayonara, Zetsubou-Sensei (2007) (Kagerō Usui)
11eyes (2009) (Avaritia)
Chrome Shelled Regios (2009) (Vanze Haldey)
Maria Holic (2009) (Narrator)
Ristorante Paradiso (2009) (Teo)
And Yet the Town Moves (2010) (Narrator)
Naruto Shippuden (2010) (Ko Hyuga)
Blood-C (2011) (Furu-Kimono)
The Idolmaster (2011) (Fortune Teller)
Hiiro no Kakera (2012) (Drei)
JoJo's Bizarre Adventure (2012–13) (Robert E.O. Speedwagon)
Robotics;Notes (2012) (Mitsuhiko Nagafukada)
Bakumatsu Gijinden Roman (2013) (Tokugawa Isesada)
 Monogatari: Second Season (2013) (Kuchinawa) 
Kanetsugu & Keiji (2013) (Toyotomi Hideyoshi)
Senyu (2013) (Mii-chan)
Transformers Go! (2013) (Bakudōra)
Akame ga Kill! (2014) (Bill)
Blade & Soul (2014) (Earl)
Inari, Konkon, Koi Iroha (2014) (Tōka Fushimi)
Lady Jewelpet (2014) (Momona Father)
Durarara!!x2 Ten (2015) (Kisuke Adabashi)
Gangsta. (2015) (Diego Montez)
Ghost in the Shell AAA (2015) (Paz)
Mr. Osomatsu (2015) (Dekapan)
One-Punch Man (2015) (Drive Knight)
Punch Line (2015) (Manbu Ishigata)
The Asterisk War (2016) (Nicolas Enfield)
B-PROJECT～Kodō＊Ambitious～ (2016) (Ninomiya)
Cerberus (2016) (Palpa)
March Comes in like a Lion (2016) (Hanaoka)
Mob Psycho 100 (2016) (Kyaku)
Servamp (2016) (Tōru Shirota)
Time Bokan 24 (2016) (MeKabuton (eps.1-10), Suzumupeaker (ep.4), Kamakirippa (ep.7))
ACCA: 13-Territory Inspection Dept. (2017) (Owl)
Blood Blockade Battlefront & Beyond (2017) (Medivac Helicopter Pilot)
Code:Realize – Guardian of Rebirth (2017) (Rempart Leonhardt)
Sagrada Reset (2017) (Shintarō Tsushima)
Banana Fish (2018) (Charlie Dickenson)
Dakaichi (2018) (Jiro Hasegawa)
Double Decker! Doug & Kirill (2018) (Narrator)
Holmes of Kyoto (2018) (Takeshi Yagashira)
Steins;Gate 0 (2018) (Alexis Leskinen)
Boogiepop and Others (2019) (Spooky E)
The Magnificent Kotobuki (2019) (Johnny)
One-Punch Man 2 (2019) (Drive Knight)
Star Twinkle PreCure (2019) (Bakenyan, Hakkenyan)
YU-NO: A Girl Who Chants Love at the Bound of this World (2019) (Atsushi Hōjō)
Vinland Saga (2019) (Leif Ericson)
No Guns Life (2019) (Hugh Cunningham)
ID – Invaded (2020) (Hitoshi Sonoda)
The House Spirit Tatami-chan (2020) (Pom Poko Maru)
Project Scard: Scar on the Praeter (2020) (Morrigan Sakiyo)
Sonny Boy (2021) (Cap)
Banished from the Hero's Party (2021) (Stormthunder)
Mushoku Tensei Part 2 (2021) (Geese Nukadia)
Ranking of Kings (2021) (Bebin)
Tokyo 24th Ward (2022) (Hiroki Shirakaba)
Summer Time Rendering (2022) (Tetsu Totsumura)
Lycoris Recoil (2022) (Shinji Yoshimatsu)
Bleach: Thousand-Year Blood War (2022) (Ōetsu Nimaiya)
The Little Lies We All Tell (2022) (Brian-sensei)
The Fire Hunter (2023) (Enzen)

OVA
Red Garden (2007) (Neel)
Bus Gamer (2008) (Santa)
Mobile Suit Gundam: The Witch from Mercury Prologue (2022) (Kenanji Avery)

Anime films
Japan, Our Homeland (2006) (Mr. Akiyama)
Ghost in the Shell: Arise (2013) (Paz)
Ghost in the Shell: The New Movie (2015) (Paz)
Mobile Suit Gundam Thunderbolt: Bandit Flower (2017) (Sebastian Morse)
Batman Ninja (2018) (Eian)
Mr. Osomatsu: The Movie (2019) (Dekapan)
Fate/stay night: Heaven's Feel III. spring song (2020) (Nagato Tohsaka)
	Mobile Suit Gundam: Cucuruz Doan's Island (2022) (Wald Ren)
Mr. Osomatsu: Hipipo-Zoku to Kagayaku Kajitsu (2022) (Dekapan)
Laid-Back Camp Movie (2022) (Shirakawa)

Video games
Saikin Koi Shiteru? (2009) (Takumi Shindō)
JoJo's Bizarre Adventure: All Star Battle (2013) (Robert E.O. Speedwagon)
JoJo's Bizarre Adventure: Eyes of Heaven (2015) (Robert E.O. Speedwagon)
NORN9 (2015) (Motohisa Tōya)
Hyperdimension Neptunia (CFW Trick)
Armored Core Last Raven (Crow)
Bloodborne (Blood Minister)
Bleach: Brave Souls (Ōetsu Nimaiya)
13 Sentinels: Aegis Rim (Juro Izumi (adult), Kyuta Shiba, Fluffy)
Stranger of Paradise: Final Fantasy Origin (2022) (Astos)
JoJo's Bizarre Adventure: All Star Battle R (2022) (Robert E.O. Speedwagon)

Tokusatsu
Kamen Rider Gaim (2014) (Dyudyuonshu (ep. 33, 40))
Uchu Sentai Kyuranger (2017) (Shaidos (ep. 17))

Dubbing

Live-action
 About Schmidt (Ray Nichols (Len Cariou))
 The Ballad of Buster Scruggs (Buster Scruggs (Tim Blake Nelson))
 Blade Runner 2049 (Coco (David Dastmalchian))
 Dune (Piter De Vries (David Dastmalchian))
 The French Dispatch (Julien Cadazio (Adrien Brody), Arthur Howitzer Jr. (Bill Murray))
 Fright Night (Jay Dee (Chris Sarandon))
 Game of Thrones (Petyr Baelish (Aidan Gillen), Maester Luwin (Donald Sumpter))
 Hostel (Josh (Derek Richardson))
 Independence Day: Resurgence (Commander Jiang (Chin Han))
 The Ipcress File (Major Dalby (Tom Hollander))
 The King's Man (King George, Kaiser Wilhelm and Tsar Nicholas (Tom Hollander))
 Limitless (FBI Special Agent Spelman Boyle (Hill Harper))
 Men in Black: International (Agent C (Rafe Spall))
 Midway (Lieutenant Clarence Earle Dickinson (Luke Kleintank))
 Mutant World (Marcus King (Kim Coates))
 Peacemaker (Clemson Murn (Chukwudi Iwuji))
 Professor Marston and the Wonder Women (William Moulton Marston (Luke Evans))
 The Shape of Water (Robert Hoffstetler / Dimitri Mosenkov (Michael Stuhlbarg))
 Six Feet Under (Federico (Freddy Rodriguez))
 Skyscraper (Zhao Long Ji (Chin Han))
 The Social Network (Bill Gates (Steve Sires))
 Straight Outta Compton (Jerry Heller (Paul Giamatti))
 Suburbicon (Bud Cooper (Oscar Isaac))
 S.W.A.T. (Commander Robert Hicks (Patrick St. Esprit))
 Those Who Wish Me Dead (Jack (Aidan Gillen))
 The Twilight Zone (Samir Wassan (Kumail Nanjiani))
 Watchmen (Wade Tillman / Looking Glass (Tim Blake Nelson))
 The Wedding Ringer (Lurch / Garvey (Jorge Garcia))
 Whiskey Cavalier (Ray Prince (Josh Hopkins))
 Yogi Bear (Chief of Staff (Nate Corddry))

Animation
 Calamity, a Childhood of Martha Jane Cannary (Ethan)
 Ralph Breaks the Internet (J.P. Spamley)
 The SpongeBob Movie: Sponge Out of Water (Squidward Tentacles)

References

External links
Official Profile at Mausu Promotion
 

Male voice actors from Hyōgo Prefecture
Japanese male video game actors
Japanese male voice actors
Living people
1971 births
20th-century Japanese male actors
21st-century Japanese male actors
Mausu Promotion voice actors